Ben Doolan (born 10 January 1973) is a former Australian rules footballer who played for Sydney and Essendon in the Australian Football League during the 1990s.

Doolan has been the proprietor of bus operator Australian Transit Group since 2004.

References

External links

1973 births
Australian rules footballers from New South Wales
Sydney Swans players
Essendon Football Club players
Albury Football Club players
Living people
Allies State of Origin players